Siegfried Mynhardt (5 March 1906 – 28 March 1996) was a South African actor.

Personal life
Mynhardt was born in Johannesburg and lived in a Wynberg army camp, where his father was a padre. He had three children with his wife, Jocelyn.

Career
As well as appearing in several films and several television projects, Mynhardt was also known for his work in both South African and British theatre. After the end of school, he started appearing in theatre productions across South Africa. He admitted that he learnt true professionalism in the 1930s, when he was performing in the Old Vic in London and sharing a flat with Alec Guinness. His credits included appearing in Dingaka, a 1965 film by the acclaimed South African director, Jamie Uys. He later appeared alongside Jacqueline Bisset in A Cape Town Affair. On 26 January 2020, Siegfried was also inaugurated as a living legend in the South African Legends Museum. He's nephew, Shaun Mynhardt dedicated the museum in memory of Siegie.

Selected filmography

References

External links

1900s births
1996 deaths
20th-century South African male actors
Male actors from Johannesburg
South African male film actors
South African male stage actors
White South African people